Flamur Noka (born March 3, 1971) is an Albanian politician, currently serving as the General Secretary of the Democratic Party of Albania. Born and raised in Kukës, in Albania's northern border with Kosovo, Noka joined the Democratic Party in the early 2000s, and quickly started climbing the ranks. From 2012 to 2013, he was Albania's Minister of the Interior.

Career
Noka is a medical doctor by training. He held positions within the Democratic Party of Albania. He was elected as a member of the Assembly of the Republic of Albania from the Democratic Party of Albania for the Kukes district. In June 2012, he was named the Interior Minister following Bujar Nishani's accession to the Presidency of Albania. In 16 February 2017 he went to Erjon Brace sitting in parliament and hit him in the face, he was obligated to leave the parliament. In 2013 he was replaced as Interior Minister by Saimir Tahiri after the heavy electoral defeat of the Democrat Party at the hands of the Socialists led by the new Prime Minister Edi Rama

References

Living people
Democratic Party of Albania politicians
Members of the Parliament of Albania
Government ministers of Albania
Interior ministers of Albania
Albanian physicians
21st-century Albanian politicians
1971 births